Sri Sundararaja Perumal Temple, better known as Klang Perumal Temple, is a 127-year-old temple located in Klang, Selangor in Malaysia. Built in 1892, then reconstructed in 2015, it is of the oldest, and the largest Vaishnavite temple in Malaysia, it is often referred to as the "Thirupathi of South East Asia" after its famous namesake in India. It is the first granite temple in Malaysia. The temple is the most popular temple of lord Vishnu in South East Asia.

The temple is located in the royal town of Klang, and is just a stone's throw away from the popular Little India in Klang.

This temple is dedicated to the Lord Vishnu in the form of Perumal (also known as Thirumaal), a very popularly worshipped form by southern Indians.

Architecture
The Gopuram of this temple is one of the great landmarks of Klang, which stands proudly along Persiaran Raja Muda Musa. It shows many sculptures and carvings of different deities, representing many epics in simple image form.

Inside the temple, there are several complexes dedicated to different deities. At the center of the temple is the Perumal Sannathi, where Lord Perumal and His consort Goddess Mahalakshmi are situated. The center complex of Lord Perumal Sannathi contains a small gopuram with the statue of all Lord Vishnu's avatars surrounding it.

On the right of the Perumal Sannathi is the Shivan Sannathi, which consists Lord Shiva, Lord Parvathi, Lord Vinayagar, Lord Muruga and Lord Ayyappan. On the left side of Perumal Sannathi is Saneshwara Sannathi, where Lord Shani and the Navagrahas is situated.

Adjacent to the center complex is Lord Anjaneya Sannathi and just at the corner outside the temple is Lord Nagaraja Sannathi.

The temple also has a multi-purpose hall called The Mahalakshami Kalyana Mandapam (Mahalakshmi Wedding Hall), a favourite place of the Indian community in Klang to have their weddings.

The entire space of this temple is befitted with air-cool system for the convenience of devotees.

Sri Sunderaraja Perumal Temple is now in the process of undergoing major renovations to restructure the temple area. It is planned to commence around November 2010 and end by 2014, with all the painstaking effort by the present temple president, Mr. S. Ananda Krishna.

Festivals
Various religious and spiritual activities are held in Klang Perumal temple all year long. But the most prominent of it is the Purataasi month celebration, the month dedicated to Lord Perumal. It is the month that falls between mid-September to mid-October, where many devotees of Perumal take strict vows to achieve spiritual conscience.

Monthlong prayers and rituals are held every day and Saturdays of this holy month is celebrated grandly in festival mood. Devotees from all over Malaysia and even the neighbouring countries throng to this temple from morning to night to pay their homage and have the grace of Lord Sri Sunderaraja Perumal.

The temple is also particularly packed on Vaikunta Ekadasi, Tamil New Year and Deepavali with devotees eager to offer their prayers on the holy day.

Contributions
Apart from its religious duties, the temple is also very active in serving its responsibility towards the society. On Saturdays, the free lunch program is held where lunch is cooked and sent to many less-privileged homes around the Klang district. Furthermore, it also arranges hospital visits from time to time to help the sick and benefit the public.

Awards and recognition
Recently, in November 2006, the temple was awarded with ISO 9001:2000 certification for its quality sustained contribution in religious, cultural and social service to Hindus. This is probably the first Hindu shrine in the world to receive an international quality service acknowledgement.

References
 Sankara Subramaniam. Temple In Selangor First To Achieve ISO 9001:2000. BERNAMA,  21 January 2007. Retrieved on 20 September 2007. (English).

Hindu temples in Malaysia
Tamil diaspora in Malaysia
Religious buildings and structures in Selangor